Mandragora may refer to:

Biology 
 Any of the species of the plant genus Mandragora, including
 Mandragora autumnalis, mandrake or autumn mandrake
 Mandragora caulescens, Himalayan mandrake
 Mandragora officinarum, mandrake or Mediterranean mandrake, the type species of the genus
 Mandragora turcomanica, Turkmenian mandrake
 Bryonia alba, known as false mandrake and English mandrake

Arts and entertainment 
 Mandragora (novel), 1991 novel by David McRobbie
 Mandragora (film), 1997 film by Wiktor Grodecki
 Mandragora (band), UK psychedelic rock band
 Mandragora (publisher), Polish publisher of comics, manga and manhwa
 Mandragora Movies, Romanian film production company
 La Mandrágora, Chilean Surrealist group
 Mandragora, ballet by Karol Szymanowski

Other uses 
 Rolando Mandragora (born 1997), Italian footballer
 Mandragora (demon), familiar demons who appear in the figures of little men without beards

See also 
 Mandrake (disambiguation)
 The Mandrake, a play by Niccolò Machiavelli, whose Italian title is La Mandragola